Freeport High School may refer to:

Freeport High School (Florida), Freeport, Florida, U.S.
Freeport High School (Illinois), Freeport, Illinois, U.S.
Freeport High School (Maine), Freeport, Maine, U.S.
Freeport High School (New York), Freeport, New York, U.S.
Freeport Area Senior High School, Freeport, Pennsylvania, U.S.

See also
Freeport Junior High School, Freeport, Pennsylvania, U.S.